Nick Bailey is a UK television gardening presenter and garden designer and a former Head Gardener at The Wicken. In 2010 he became Head Gardener at the Chelsea Physic Garden.

He studied horticulture at Hadlow College continuing his studies there to obtain a first in Landscape Design in 1995 awarded by the University of Greenwich. He is a Silver Gilt winner at the RHS Chelsea Flower Show. His first broadcasting job was presenting Gardens Wild and Wonderful in South Africa which he did in 1995 and 1996 after which he spent 4 years as a panellist on BBC Radio Norfolk’s programme, 'Garden Party'. He is now a regular contributor to Gardeners World.

References

Year of birth missing (living people)
British television presenters
British garden writers
Living people
Alumni of the University of Greenwich